Barran Temple is a Sabaean temple near Marib, Yemen; also known as "Throne of Bilqis", it was dedicated to the god al-Maqah.

Background
The temple is located to the west of the Temple of Awwam, also dedicated to the god Almaqah.  The main features of the structure are the six columns and the sacred well in the middle of the courtyard. Until the 1988 excavations only five columns were known to exist, when remains of another were discovered.  The temple is considered to be the largest pre-Islamic temple in Yemen.

It was partly excavated by Wendell Phillips' expedition of 1951–1952.  In addition to its religious functions the complex may have also served as a documentation center, as the inscriptions describing the events surrounding the Sabaean state were found on the walls.

References

Archaeological sites in Yemen
History of Yemen
Sabaean architecture
Religious buildings and structures in Yemen
Temples
World Heritage Sites in Yemen
Landmarks of the Ancient Kingdom of Saba (Marib)